Glen Burnie is an unincorporated town and census-designated place (CDP) in Anne Arundel County, Maryland, United States. It is a suburb of Baltimore. The population of Glen Burnie was 67,639 at the 2010 census.

History
In 1812, Elias Glenn, a district attorney, established a county seat near what is currently known as Brooklyn Park. He named his property "Glennsburne".

The name was changed to "Glennsbourne Farm", and eventually "Glenburnie", as the property was passed through Glenn's descendants. Records also show the name as "Tracey's Station" and "Myrtle", after local postmaster Samuel Sewell Tracey and one of Tracey's boarders, before the final decision was made.

In 1854, William Wilkins Glenn, Elias Glenn's grandson, incorporated the Curtis Creek Mining, Furnace and Manufacturing Company into his family's property. The business flourished during the 19th century, and with it came several thousand acres of land in northern Anne Arundel County.

Upon the death of William Wilkins Glenn, his son, brother and nephew began to manage the family's business affairs, and Glenburnie became an official state subdivision in 1888. The Glenn family contracted George T. Melvin and Henry S. Mancha to lay out and promote the town. It would not be until 1930 that postmaster Louis J. DeAlba decided two words were better than one, and gave the town a final name change to the current Glen Burnie.

Buildings

Among the earliest Glen Burnie schools was First Avenue Elementary, built in 1899. The oldest area church is St. Alban's Episcopal, which was built in 1904, with many of its bricks dating back to Marley Chapel, an early Maryland parish from the 1730s. Crain Highway, one of Glen Burnie's main thoroughfares (named after Robert Crain), opened in 1927 and Ritchie Highway (Maryland Route 2, named for ex-Governor Albert C. Ritchie) followed in 1939. Ritchie Highway carried nearly all Baltimore-area traffic headed for Annapolis and the Chesapeake Bay Bridge until an alternate bypass road, Interstate 97, opened in the 1980s.

Until 1950 the Baltimore and Annapolis Railroad provided passenger and freight service through Glen Burnie from Annapolis to Baltimore; passenger service ended in February 1950 due to increased competition from buses and private automobiles, but freight service continued until Hurricane Agnes did so much damage to a trestle crossing the Severn River in Annapolis that the trestle was condemned for use by trains by the Army Corps of Engineers in the late 1960s. (The trestle remained as a haven for fishermen and crabbers until it was dismantled.) North Glen Burnie is now served by the Baltimore Light Rail system's Cromwell/Glen Burnie station.

Schools and churches were built in the ensuing decades, and construction was completed on Harundale Mall, the first enclosed shopping center east of the Mississippi River, in 1958. It was one of the first shopping centers to be called a "mall" and was developed by James W. Rouse of the Rouse Company (which also developed nearby Columbia, Maryland). The mall was developed in a joint effort with a local real estate developer, Charles Steffey. The originally planned location was not on Ritchie Highway but on Crain Highway (the main arterial for Glen Burnie). Charlie Steffey and Jim Rouse negotiated unsuccessfully with the "city fathers" of Glen Burnie, offering to regenerate the (then failing) center of town with their revolutionary concept. The "sticking point" was that the intersection of Crain Highway and Quarterfield Road (the proposed location) habitually flooded in even nominal rainstorms, to the point of cars being up to their doors in the river that ensued.

The "city fathers" decided that the advantage of having the "mall" there was overshadowed by the cost of fixing the storm water situation and declined. As a result, Glen Burnie Mall followed in 1962. Marley Station, another large shopping center, opened in February 1987. The Maryland Motor Vehicle Administration office building employs many people in town. In the 1970s, developers tried to make Glen Burnie more urban by building and funding new projects, projects like Empire Towers in 1974, or Crain Towers in 1990, then with the addition of an Anne Arundel Community College branch in the town center. In 1965, North Arundel Hospital opened as a community hospital, but as it was constantly overflowed with patients, the University of Maryland Medical System bought the hospital in 2000 and renovated it to accommodate more patients and equipment.

Geography
Glen Burnie is a suburb of Baltimore. It is located at  (39.159982, −76.610588). The intersection of Central Avenue and Crain Highway forms the boundaries of the NW, SW, NE & SE postal quadrants in the community's center.

Climate
The climate in this area is characterized by hot, humid summers and generally mild to cool winters.  According to the Köppen Climate Classification system, Glen Burnie has a humid subtropical climate, abbreviated "Cfa" on climate maps.

Education
Monsignor Slade Catholic School

The following public schools are in Glen Burnie or serve students who reside in Glen Burnie:

Glen Burnie is also home to a campus of Anne Arundel Community College.

Transportation

Aviation
The Baltimore–Washington International Airport is directly adjacent to the west of Glen Burnie, providing the city access to domestic and international flights.

Public transit
As the southern terminus of the Cromwell Branch of the Baltimore Light Rail, Glen Burnie is home to two light rail stops, Ferndale and Cromwell / Glen Burnie. Cromwell Station, located at the intersection of Baltimore-Annapolis Boulevard and Dorsey Road, is equipped with a free park-and-ride for commuters, as well as a bus connection to MTA Route 14 and bike connection to the Baltimore & Annapolis Trail.

BWI Rail Station located in nearby Linthicum provides regional rail service to Glen Burnie via the MARC Penn Line and Amtrak.

Roads
The Glen Burnie area is served by the following major roadways:
 MD 2 Governor Ritchie Highway: Glen Burnie's main commercial boulevard running north south.
 MD 3 Robert Crain Highway: Glen Burnie's main street stemming off of MD 2 towards New Cut Road and Veterans Highway.
 MD 10 Arundel Expressway: A by-pass expressway running north–south from the Baltimore Beltway to Ritchie Highway in Pasadena.
 MD 100 Paul T, Pitcher Memorial Highway: Another expressway running east–west connecting Glen Burnie to Ellicott City and Gibson Island.
 I-97 Glen Burnie Bypass: A major north–south interstate highway connecting Glen Burnie to Baltimore and Annapolis.
 I-695 Baltimore Beltway: Located in north Glen Burnie, the Baltimore Beltway provides circumferential travel throughout Greater Baltimore. 
Airport Loop A set of highways forming a loop around BWI Thurgood Marshall Airport.

Notable people

Demographics

As of the census of 2000, there were 38,922 people, 15,210 households, and 9,977 families residing in the CDP. The racial makeup of the CDP was 81.11% White, 13.52% Black, 0.35% Native American, 2.40% Asian, 0.07% Pacific Islander, 0.78% from other races, and 1.78% from two or more races. Hispanic or Latino of any race were 2.46% of the population.

There were 15,210 households, out of which 29.6% had children under the age of 18 living with them, 47.1% were married couples living together, 13.1% had a female householder with no husband present, and 34.4% were non-families. 27.2% of all households were made up of individuals, and 9.3% had someone living alone who was 65 years of age or older. The average household size was 2.53 and the average family size was 3.07.

In the CDP, the population was spread out, with 23.7% under the age of 18, 9.0% from 18 to 24, 32.3% from 25 to 44, 22.1% from 45 to 64, and 12.9% who were 65 years of age or older. The median age was 36 years. For every 100 females, there were 94.7 males. For every 100 females age 18 and over, there were 92.2 males.

The median income for a household in the CDP was $45,281, and the median income for a family was $51,845. Males had a median income of $35,957 versus $27,078 for females. The per capita income for the CDP was $20,170. About 5.9% of families and 7.7% of the population were below the poverty line, including 10.2% of those under age 18 and 9.1% of those age 65 or over.

See also
 Baltimore & Annapolis Trail
 Glen Burnie High School - football field is featured in the film The Replacements
 Harundale Mall
 Marley Station

References

External links

 
Census-designated places in Anne Arundel County, Maryland
Census-designated places in Maryland
Populated places established in 1812
1812 establishments in Maryland